The Deutsche Shakespeare-Gesellschaft (German Shakespeare Society) was founded on the occasion of the 300th birthday of William Shakespeare on 23 April 1864. It was the first scientific and cultural association of its type in Weimar, and is one of the oldest functioning literary societies in the world.

References

Organisations based in Thuringia
Weimar
1864 establishments in Germany
Organizations established in 1864